Markus Kattner (born 24 September 1970 in Bayreuth, West Germany) is a German-Swiss business consultant and former association football executive. He served as acting Secretary-General of FIFA from September 2015 to May 2016, but was sacked after being accused of paying himself bonuses worth millions of US Dollars during a previous stint as FIFA's director of Finance. Markus Kattner has begun legal proceedings against FIFA before the competent court in Zurich as he believes his dismissal to be unjustified.

Biography
Markus Kattner grew up in Munich and for four years he played basketball in the second division of the Basketball Bundesliga. He graduated with a bachelor's degree in engineering from the Technical University of Munich (TUM) and completed a doctorate degree at the Swiss Federal Institute of Technology in Lausanne (EPFL, 1999).

Before joining FIFA, Kattner worked as a consultant for McKinsey & Company in Switzerland along Philippe Blatter, a nephew of FIFA's president Joseph Blatter, and the pair worked together while advising the Federation. In 2003, he joined FIFA as director of Finance and in September 2015, when Jerome Valcke was sacked for financial irregularities, Kattner took over as acting secretary-general. Kattner himself was sacked in May 2016, after being accused of paying himself bonuses worth millions of US Dollars over a six-year period (2008–2014). Markus Kattner has begun legal proceedings against FIFA before the competent court in Zurich as he believes his dismissal to be unfair, maintaining that the compensation payments were perfectly above board and did not break a single FIFA statute. In June 2020, he received a 10 years ban from football and was fined the amount of CHF 1,000,000 after an investigation into bonus payments.

Personal life
Kattner has German-Swiss dual nationality and is married with three daughters. He is a Bayern Munich supporter and also likes running, skiing and playing the piano.

References 

FIFA officials
German men's basketball players
1970 births
Technical University of Munich alumni
École Polytechnique Fédérale de Lausanne alumni
McKinsey & Company people
People from Bayreuth
German football chairmen and investors
Swiss football chairmen and investors
Living people